Chhatawa is a town and Village Development Committee  in Bara District in the Narayani Zone of south-eastern Nepal. At the time of the 2011 Nepal census it had a population of 5,660 persons living in 771 individual households. There were 2,992 males and 2,668 females at the time of census.

References

External links
UN map of the municipalities of Bara District

Populated places in Bara District